Shoes That Fit is a 501(c)(3) non-profit organization based in Claremont, California, that provides new shoes to low-income children. The mission of Shoes That Fit is to tackle one of the most visible signs of poverty in America by giving children in need new athletic shoes.

History
Shoes That Fit began in 1992 helping children at one elementary school in Pomona, California. Today, Shoes That Fit helps children in all 50 U.S. states and the District of Columbia.  Since its founding, Shoes That Fit has provided over 2.4 million new pairs of shoes and other necessities.

In 2021, Shoes That Fit provided new shoes to over 125,000 children across the U.S. There are approximately 300 Shoes That Fit volunteer groups in 50 states. 77% of participating schools report an increase in self-esteem after children receive new shoes. And 38% of schools report an increase in attendance when kids get their new shoes.

References 
Fritz, J. (2010). "Cause of the Week: Shoes That Fit", Joanne's Nonprofits Blog, Retrieved August 29, 2010 from http://nonprofit.about.com/b/2010/06/22/cause-of-the-week-shoes-that-fit.htm 

http://www.charitynavigator.org/index.cfm?bay=search.summary&orgid=10548

http://www.bbb.org/charity-reviews/national/shoes-that-fit-in-claremont-ca-16308

External links 
 
Huffington Post - For A Child in Need, New Shoes Make All The Difference
CNN: Goodness of Giving
Founder's Story

Non-profit organizations based in California
501(c)(3) organizations